Indy de Vroome was the defending champion but chose not to participate.

Karman Thandi won the title, defeating Katherine Sebov in the final, 3–6, 6–4, 6–3.

Seeds

Draw

Finals

Top half

Bottom half

References

External Links
Main Draw

Challenger Banque Nationale de Saguenay - Singles